Jonathan Littell (born October 10, 1967) is a writer living in Barcelona. He grew up in France and the United States and is a citizen of both countries. After acquiring his bachelor's degree he worked for a humanitarian organisation for nine years, leaving his job in 2001 in order to concentrate on writing. His first novel written in French, The Kindly Ones (2006; Les Bienveillantes), won two major French awards, including the Prix Goncourt and the Prix de l'Académie française.

Early life and career
Littell is the son of author Robert Littell. Although his grandparents were Jews who emigrated from Russia to the United States at the end of the 19th century, Littell does not define himself as a Jew "at all," and is quoted as saying, "for me Judaism is more [of] a historical background."

Born in New York City, Littell arrived in France at age three, then completed part of his education in his native country from age 13 to 16, before returning to France to achieve his baccalauréat. He returned again to the United States where he attended Yale University and graduated with a bachelor's degree in 1989. During his years in Yale, he finished his first book, Bad Voltage, and later on met William S. Burroughs, who left a lasting impression on him. Due to his influence, he started to read Burroughs, as well as Sade, Blanchot, Genet, Céline, Bataille and Beckett. Afterwards, he worked as a translator, rendering French works by Sade, Blanchot, Genet and Quignard into English. At the same time, he started to write a ten-volume book, but gave up the project after the third volume.

From 1994 to 2001, he worked for the international humanitarian organization Action Against Hunger, working mainly in Bosnia and Herzegovina, but also in Chechnya, Democratic Republic of Congo, Sierra Leone, Caucasus, Afghanistan and Moscow. In January 2001 he was victim of an ambush in Chechnya, during which he was slightly wounded. In the same year he decided to quit his job in order to concentrate on the research of his second book, The Kindly Ones. During that time, he also worked as a consultant for humanitarian organizations.

Littell obtained French citizenship (while being able to keep the American one) in March 2007 after French officials made use of a clause stating that any French speaker whose "meritorious actions contribute to the glory of France" are allowed to become citizens, despite not fulfilling the requirement that he live in France for more than six months out of the year.

Works
Littell's novel The Kindly Ones was written in French and was published in France in 2006. The novel is the story of World War II and the Eastern Front, through the fictional memories of an articulate SS officer named Maximilien Aue.

Littell said he was inspired to write the novel after seeing a photograph of Zoya Kosmodemyanskaya, a Soviet partisan executed by the Wehrmacht. He traces the original inspiration for the book from seeing Claude Lanzmann’s film Shoah, an acclaimed documentary about the Holocaust, in 1991. He began research for the book in 2001 and started the first draft eighteen months later, after he had read around two hundred books about the Third Reich and the Eastern Front, as well as visiting Germany, East Europe and Caucasus. Littell claims that he undertook the creation of his main character, Aue, by imagining what he himself would have done had he been born in pre-war Germany and had become a National Socialist.

Littell's only previously published book, the cyberpunk novel Bad Voltage, which Littell considers "a very bad science-fiction novel", tells the story of Lynx, a "half-breed" who lives in a futuristic Paris. Many scenes in the novel take place in the Paris Catacombs; he also includes an unusual appendix in this novel which lists all the music and songs he listened to while composing. In addition, Littell has published a detailed intelligence report about the security organs of the Russian Federation, an analysis of Léon Degrelle's book La Campagne de Russie, influenced by the works of the sociologist Klaus Theweleit, one book with four texts written before The Kindly Ones and, finally, a short essay.

Following The Kindly Ones, Littell directed a documentary titled Wrong Elements, in which he interviews the former child soldiers of Joseph Kony. The film was screened out of competition at the 2016 Cannes Film Festival.

Awards

The Kindly Ones won the 2006 Prix Goncourt and the grand prix du roman of the Académie française. By the end of 2007, more than 700,000 copies had been sold in France.

Littell was recognised for his contributions in the area of overwrought erotica when the English translation of The Kindly Ones won the 2009 Bad Sex in Fiction Award from The Literary Review, a British literary journal. Littell reportedly beat tough competition for that year's honours, with Philip Roth and Nick Cave among the writers filling out the short list.

He won the Prix Sade in 2018 for Une vieille histoire.

Commentary 
In a May 2008 interview with Haaretz, Littell accused Israel of using the Holocaust for political gain and likened Israel's behavior in the occupied territories to that of the Nazis prior to World War II: "If the [Israeli] government would let the soldiers do worse things, they would. Everyone says, 'Look how the Germans dealt with the Jews even before the Holocaust: cutting the beards, humiliating them in public, forcing them to clean the street.' That kind of stuff happens in the territories every day. Every goddamn day." However, he also said that "We really cannot compare the two".

Works
1989 – Bad Voltage
2006 – Les Bienveillantes (The Kindly Ones, 2009)
2006 – The Security Organs of the Russian Federation. A Brief History 1991–2004
2008 – Le Sec et L'Humide
2008 – Études
2008 – Georgisches Reisetagebuch
2009 – Récit sur Rien
2009 – Tchétchénie, An III
2010 – En Pièces
2011 – Triptyque: Trois études sur Francis Bacon (Triptych: Three Studies after Francis Bacon, 2013)
2011 – The Invisible Enemy
2012 – Une vieille histoire
2012 – Carnets de Homs (Syrian Notebooks: Inside the Homs uprising, 2015)
2013 – The Fata Morgana Books
2022 - De l'agression russe. Écrits polémiques

Awards
Grand prix du roman de l'Académie française, 2006, for Les Bienveillantes
Prix Goncourt, 2006, for Les Bienveillantes
Bad Sex in Fiction Award, 2009, for The Kindly Ones

Notes

References

Further reading
 

1967 births
American expatriates in France
American expatriates in Spain
American people of Russian-Jewish descent
American humanitarians
American male writers
Exophonic writers
American writers in French
French male writers
Living people
Writers from New York City
People of the Chechen wars
Prix Goncourt winners
Yale University alumni
Grand Prix du roman de l'Académie française winners